Daughter of the Regiment (German: Die Tochter des Regiments) is a 1933 Austrian-German comedy film directed by Carl Lamac and starring Anny Ondra, Werner Fuetterer and Adele Sandrock. It is loosely based on the 1840 opera La fille du regiment by Gaetano Donizetti, with the setting updated from the Napoleonic to the First World War. A separate French-language version was also released, with Ondra reprising her role.

Synopsis
A baby girl is found and rescued by a Scottish regiment during the First World War and adopted as the regiment's daughter. Many years later she is a grown-up when the Highlanders are sent on a special mission to the mountains of Bavaria to crack down on whiskey smugglers.

Cast
Anny Ondra as Mary Dreizehn
Werner Fuetterer as Lord Robert
Adele Sandrock as Lady Diana Heddingbroke
Otto Wallburg as Sergeant Bully
Jean Aymé as Jerome 
Albert Heine as General  
Fritz Heller
Fritz Imhoff 
Walter Jensen
Josef Rovenský
Franz Schafheitlin as Major
Willy Stettner as Leutnant William
Ilka Thimm as Lady Georgia Bettersford
Max Willenz

References

External links

1933 comedy films
German comedy films
Austrian comedy films
Films of Nazi Germany
Films of the Weimar Republic
Films directed by Karel Lamač
German World War I films
Films set in Bavaria
Films based on operas
German multilingual films
Austrian multilingual films
Gaetano Donizetti
Austrian black-and-white films
German black-and-white films
1933 multilingual films
1930s German films